Janomima dannfelti is a moth in the family Eupterotidae. It was described by Per Olof Christopher Aurivillius in 1893. It is found in Burundi, Cameroon, the Democratic Republic of the Congo, Equatorial Guinea, Eritrea, Malawi, South Africa and Uganda.

References

Moths described in 1893
Eupterotinae